Egilshöll, also known as Egilshöllin, is a multi-purpose sports and entertainment facility located in the Grafarvogur district of Iceland's capital Reykjavík. It features three football pitches, an ice rink, school sports hall, gym, shooting range, tennis courts and a cinema.

Events

Concerts 
Egilshöllin has also been used as a music venue hosting numerous events of the Iceland Symphony Orchestra amongst others.

See also
 List of indoor arenas in Nordic countries

References

External links 
 Official website

Indoor arenas in Iceland
Sports venues in Reykjavík
Music venues in Iceland
Football venues in Iceland
Tennis venues
2002 establishments in Iceland
Sports venues completed in 2002